Lasallia is a genus of lichenized fungi in the family Umbilicariaceae. 

The genus name of Lasallia is in honour of Mr. Lasalle (around 1820), who was a French gardener and botanist, who worked in Fontainebleau.

It was circumscribed by François Victor Mérat de Vaumartoise in Nouv. Fl. Paris ed.2, vol.1 on page 202 in 1821. 

The genus contains 12 species with a widespread, but predominantly temperate distribution. Phylogenetic analysis of internal transcribed spacer DNA has shown that the genus is monophyletic.

High performance liquid chromatography analysis of eleven Lasallia species revealed a number of secondary metabolites in this genus, including gyrophoric acid, lecanoric acid, umbilicaric acid, 7-chloroemodin, valsarin, skyrin, hiascic acid, and ovoic acid.

References

External links
Lasallia at Index Fungorum

Lichen genera
Lecanoromycetes genera
Umbilicariales
Taxa described in 1821